On March 11, 1990, Chile transitioned to a democracy, ending their military regime led by General Augusto Pinochet. This transition lasted 15 years. Unlike most democratic transitions led by either the elite or the people, this democratic transition process is known as an intermediate transition - a transition involving both the regime and the civil society.  Throughout the transition, as the regime increased repressive violence, it simultaneously supported liberalization - progressively strengthening democratic institutions and gradually weakening that of the military. 

There are three factors that contributed to the rise of democracy: the economy, the role of the military and domestic politics. Rapid economic growth (attributed to a low inflation environment), a decline in dictatorship, and the decision of political parties to come together became the main motivation for a broad ideological coalition to be created in an effort to defeat Pinochet and his military rule. Today, Chile is ranked 29 in the current democracy index.

The preparation for the transition began within the dictatorship itself when a Constitution establishing a transition itinerary was approved in a plebiscite. From 11 March 1981 to March 1990, several organic constitutional laws were approved, leading to the final restoration of democracy. After the 1988 plebiscite, the 1980 Constitution (which is still in effect today) was amended to ease provisions for future amendments to the constitution, create more seats in the senate, diminish the role of the National Security Council, and equalize the number of civilian and military members (four members each).

Christian Democrat Patricio Aylwin served from 1990 to 1994 and was succeeded by another Christian Democrat, Eduardo Frei Ruiz-Tagle (son of Eduardo Frei Montalva), leading the same coalition for a six-year term. Ricardo Lagos Escobar of the Socialist Party and the Party for Democracy led the Concertacion to a narrower victory in the 2000 presidential election. His term ended on 11 March 2006, when Michelle Bachelet of the Socialist Party took office. Center-right businessman Sebastián Piñera, of National Renewal, assumed the presidency on 11 March 2010, after Bachelet's term expired. Bachelet returned to the office on 11 March 2014, being succeeded by Piñera in the following term (2018–2022).

1988 plebiscite and reform of the Constitution

Passed under tight military control in 1980, the Chilean constitution's legal dispositions were designed to lead to the convocation of all citizens to a plebiscite during which the Chilean people would ratify a candidate, proposed by the Chief of Staff of the Chilean Armed Forces and by the General Director of the Carabineros, the national police force, and who would become the President of Chile for an eight-year term. In 1980, this meant that the Chilean people were supposed to approve Augusto Pinochet's candidacy, assuring him popular legitimacy and the sanction of a vote. If the people refused the junta's chosen candidate, the military would relinquish political control to the civilians, leading to presidential and parliamentary democratic elections the following year, putting an end to the military government.

In 1987, Pinochet's government passed a law allowing the creation of political parties and another law allowing the opening of national registers of voters. If the majority of the people voted "yes" to Pinochet's plebiscite, he would have remained in power for the next eight years. Instead, Congress was elected and installed on 11 March 1990.

Context and causes of Pinochet's decision to follow the Constitution
Various factors led to Pinochet's decision to resume this procedure, including the situation in the Soviet Union, where Mikhail Gorbachev had initiated the glasnost and the perestroika democratic reforms. Those reforms led to the fall of the Berlin Wall in 1989 and to the official end of the Cold War, which was an important factor.

The Cold War had important consequences in South America, considered by the United States to be a full part of the Western Bloc, in contrast with the Eastern Bloc, a division born with the end of World War II and the Yalta Conference. Following the 1959 Cuban Revolution and the local implementation in several countries of Che Guevara's foco theory, the US waged a war in South America against the "Communists subversives," leading to support in Chile of the right-wing, which would culminate with the coup of 1973 in Chile. In a few years, all of South America was covered by similar military dictatorships, called juntas. In Paraguay, Alfredo Stroessner was in power since 1954; in Brazil, left-wing President João Goulart was overthrown by a military coup in 1964; in Bolivia, General Hugo Banzer overthrew leftist General Juan José Torres in 1971; in Uruguay, considered the "Switzerland" of South America, Juan María Bordaberry seized power in the 27 June 1973 coup. A "Dirty War" was waged all over the continent, culminating with Operation Condor, an agreement between security services of the Southern Cone, other South American countries, and the US government which provided training to repress and assassinate domestic political opponents. In 1976, militaries seized power in Argentina and supported the 1980 "Cocaine Coup" of Luis García Meza Tejada in Bolivia, before training the Contras in Nicaragua where the Sandinista National Liberation Front, headed by Daniel Ortega, had taken power in 1979. Similar military coups took place in Guatemala and in El Salvador. In the 1980s, however, the situation progressively evolved in the world as in South America, despite a renewal of the Cold War from 1979 to 1985, the year during which Gorbachev replaced Konstantin Chernenko as leader of the USSR.

Another alleged reason of Pinochet's decision to call for elections was Pope John Paul II's April 1987 visit to Chile: he visited Santiago, Viña del Mar, Valparaíso, Temuco, Punta Arenas, Puerto Montt and Antofagasta. Before his pilgrimage to Latin America, the pontiff criticized Pinochet's regime as "dictatorial" while speaking with reporters. According to The New York Times, he was "using unusually strong language" to criticize Pinochet and told the journalists that the Church in Chile must not only pray, but actively fight for the restoration of democracy in Chile. During his 1987 Chilean visit, the Polish pope asked Chile's 31 Catholic bishops to campaign for free elections in the country. According to George Weigel, he held a meeting with Pinochet during which they discussed the topic of the return to democracy. John Paul II allegedly pushed Pinochet to accept a democratic opening of the regime, and even called for his resignation. In 2007, Cardinal Stanisław Dziwisz, acting as Pope John Paul II's secretary, confirmed that the Pope asked Pinochet to step down and transfer power over to civilian authorities during his visit. John Paul II also supported the Vicariate of Solidarity during his visit, which was a Church-led pro-democracy, anti-Pinochet organization. John Paul II visited the Vicariate of Solidarity's offices, spoke with its workers, and "called upon them to continue their work, emphasizing that the Gospel consistently urges respect for human rights." Some have erroneously accused John Paul II of affirming Pinochet's regime by appearing with the Chilean ruler in his balcony. However, Cardinal Roberto Tucci, organizer of John Paul II's pilgrimages, revealed that Pinochet tricked the pontiff by telling him he would take him to his living room, while in reality he took him to his balcony. Tucci claims that the pontiff was "furious."

Whatever the case, political advertisement was legalized on 5 September 1987, and became a key element of the campaign for the "NO" to the referendum, which countered the official campaign which presaged a return to a Popular Unity government in case of Pinochet's defeat. Finally, the "NO" to Pinochet won with 55.99% of the votes, against 44.01% of the votes. As a result, presidential and legislative elections were called for the following year.

Furthermore, in July 1989, a constitutional referendum took place after long negotiations between the government and the opposition. If approved, 54 constitutional reforms were to be implemented, among which the reform of the way that the Constitution itself could be reformed, the restriction of state of emergency dispositions, the affirmation of political pluralism, the strengthening of constitutional rights as well as of the democratic principle and participation to the political life. All parties in the political spectrum supported the reforms, with the exception of the small right-wing Avanzada Nacional and other minor parties. Reforms were passed with 91.25% of the vote.

Aylwin administration

The Concertación coalition, which supported the return to democracy, gathered the Christian Democrat Party (PDC), the Socialist Party (PS), the Party for Democracy (PPD) and the Social Democrat Radical Party (PRSD). Christian Democrat Patricio Aylwin won a sweeping victory in the December 1989 elections, the first democratic elections since the 1970 election won by Salvador Allende. Patricio Aylwin had gathered 3,850,023 votes (55.17%), while the center-right supermarket tycoon Francisco Javier Errázuriz Talavera from the UCCP party managed to take 15.05% of the vote, whose main effect was lowering right-wing candidate Hernán Büchi's votes to 29.40% (approximately 2 million votes).

The Concertación coalition dominated Chilean politics for much of the next two decades. In February 1991, it established the National Commission for Truth and Reconciliation, releasing the Rettig Report on human rights violations during Augusto Pinochet's dictatorship. This report, contested by human rights NGOs and associations of political prisoners, counted only 2,279 cases of "disappearances" which could be proved and registered. Of course, the very nature of "disappearances" made such investigations very difficult, while many victims were still intimidated by the authorities, and did not dare go to the local police center to register themselves on lists, since the police officers were the same as during the dictatorship.

Several years later, the same problem arose with the 2004 Valech Report, which counted almost 30,000 victims of torture, among testimony from 35,000 people. However, the Rettig Report did list important detention and torture centers, such as the Esmeralda ship, the Víctor Jara Stadium, Villa Grimaldi, etc. Registration of victims of the dictatorship, and the following trials in the 2000s of military personnel guilty of human rights violations, dominated the struggle for the recognition of crimes committed during the dictatorship by human rights NGOs and associations of political prisoners, many of whom resided in exile.

Besides implementing the Rettig Commission, Aylwin's government established a Comisión Especial de Pueblos indígenas (Special Commission of Indigenous People), whose report provided the intellectual framework of the "Indigenous Law" (ley indígena) or law n° 19 253. The law went into effect on 28 September 1993 and recognized the Mapuche people as an inherent part of the Chilean nation. Other indigenous people officially recognized included Aymaras, Atacameñas, Collas, Quechuas, Rapa-Nui, Yámanas and Kawashkars. Despite this state proclamation of indigenous rights, conflicts brought by land-occupations and Mapuche's claims led to state repression and the use of the anti-terrorist law against Mapuche activists, a law instated by the military junta.

Frei Ruiz-Tagle administration

Preparing for the 1993 election, the Concertación held primaries in May 1993, which pitted left-wing Ricardo Lagos (PPD) against Christian-Democrat Eduardo Frei Ruiz-Tagle, (PDC), the son of former President Eduardo Frei Montalva (1911–1982, President from 1964 to 1970). Eduardo Frei won these primaries by a large majority of 63%.

The right-wing, grouped as the Alliance for Chile, also held primaries between 2 candidates: Sebastián Piñera of the National Renewal (RN) the largest right-wing party at the time and who had supported the "NO" during the 1988 plebiscite on the return to civilian rule, and  Arturo Alessandri Besa, former member of the National Party (PN), and the nephew of Jorge Alessandri , former President of the Republic during the term 1958 - 1964 and Presidential Candidate of the Right-wing in the 1970 election . Alessandri won those primaries, and thus represented the Alliance for Chile against the Concertación.

Others candidates included José Piñera, who was the former Minister in the early 1980s that had implemented the law granting property of copper to the Chilean Armed Forces and presented himself as an independent (6%); ecologist Manfred Max-Neef (5.55%), representative of the Left-Wing Democratic Alternative, which gathered the Communist Party (PCC), MAPU (part of the Popular Unity coalition of Allende) and the Christian Left Party; Eugenio Pizarro Poblete (less than 5%); and finally Cristián Reitze Campos of the left-wing Humanist Party (1.1%).

On 28 May 1993, the Boinazo took place, during which paratroopers surrounded the Chilean Army headquarters located close by to the Palacio de la Moneda. The motive for the military uprising was the opening of investigations concerning the "Pinocheques", or checks received by Pinochet for a total amount of $3 million in the frame of kickbacks from an arms deal. A few days before (and unnoticed at the time), Jorge Schaulsohn, President of the Chamber of Deputies, had also denounced irregularities during arms trade committed by the Chilean Army through the intermediary of the FAMAE (Factories and Arsenals of the Army of Chile) — which was later connected to the Gerardo Huber case, a Chilean Army Colonel and agent of DINA who was assassinated the previous year.

Eduardo Frei Ruiz-Tagle finally won the election in the first round in December 1993 with an absolute majority of almost 58% (more than 4 million votes) against Arturo Allesandri who gathered 24.4% (around 1,700 000 votes). Eduardo Frei took office in March 1994 for a 6-year term until 2000. During his term, it was not possible to judge any military for his role during the dictatorship, while large sectors of the Chilean society remained Pinochetista.

Arrest and trial of Pinochet and Lagos administration

Following an agreement between Pinochet and Andrés Zaldívar, president of the Senate, Zaldavír voted to abolish 11 September as a National Holiday which celebrated the 1973 coup. Supporters of Pinochet had blocked any such attempts until then. The same year, Pinochet traveled to London for back surgery. Once there, he was arrested on the orders of Spanish judge Baltasar Garzón, provoking worldwide attention, not only because of the history of Chile and South America, but also because this was one of the first arrests of a dictator based on the universal jurisdiction principle. Pinochet tried to defend himself by referring to the State Immunity Act of 1978, an argument rejected by British judicial system. However, UK Home Secretary Jack Straw released him on medical grounds, and refused to extradite him to Spain. Pinochet returned to Chile in March 2000. Upon descending the plane in his wheelchair, he quickly stood up and saluted the cheering crowd of supporters, including an army band playing his favorite military march tunes, which was awaiting him at the airport in Santiago. President Ricardo Lagos, who had just been sworn in on 11 March, said the retired general's televised arrival had damaged Chile's image, while thousands demonstrated against him.

Representing the Concertación coalition for democracy, Ricardo Lagos had narrowly won the election just a few months before by a very tight margin of less than 200,000 votes (51.32%) against Joaquín Lavín  who represented the right-wing Alliance for Chile (around 49%). None of the six candidates had obtained an absolute majority on the first round held on 12 December 1999. Lagos was sworn-in for a 6-year term on 11 March 2000.

In June 2000, the Congress passed a new law which granted anonymity to members of the armed forces who provide information on the desaparecidos. Meanwhile, the trials concerning human rights violations during the dictatorship continued. Pinochet was stripped of his parliamentary immunity in August 2000 by the Supreme Court and was indicted by judge Juan Guzmán Tapia. In 1999, Tapia had ordered the arrest of five military men, including General Pedro Espinoza Bravo of the DINA, for their role in the Caravan of Death following 11 September coup. Arguing that the bodies of the "disappeared" were still missing, he made jurisprudence which lifted any prescription on the crimes committed by the military.  Pinochet's trial continued until his death on 10 December 2006, with alternating indictments for specific cases, lifting of immunities by the Supreme Court or to the contrary immunity from prosecution, with his health as main argument for, or against, his prosecution. In March 2005, the Supreme Court affirmed Pinochet's immunity concerning the 1974 assassination of General Carlos Prats in Buenos Aires, which had taken place as part of Operation Condor. However, he was deemed fit to stand trial for Operation Colombo, during which 119 political opponents were "disappeared" in Argentina. The Chilean justice also lifted his immunity on the Villa Grimaldi case, a detention and torture center in the outskirts of Santiago.

Pinochet, who still benefited from a reputation of righteousness from his supporters, lost legitimacy when he was put under house arrest on tax fraud and passport forgery following the publication of a report concerning the Riggs Bank in July 2004 by the US Senate Permanent Subcommittee on Investigations. The report was a consequence of investigations on financial fundings of the September 11th 2001 attacks in the US. The bank controlled between US$4 million and $8 million of Pinochet's assets, as he lived in Santiago in a modest house, hiding his wealth. According to the report, Riggs Bank participated in money laundering for Pinochet, setting up offshore shell corporations (referring to Pinochet as only "a former public official") and hiding his accounts from regulatory agencies. Related to Pinochet's and his family secret bank accounts in United States and in Caraïbs islands, this tax fraud filing for an amount of $27 million shocked the conservative sectors who still supported him. Ninety percent of these funds were raised between 1990 and 1998, when Pinochet was chief of the Chilean armies, and essentially would have come from weapons trafficking when purchasing Belgian "Mirage" air-fighters in 1994, Dutch "Léopard" tanks, Swiss "Mowag" tanks, or by illegal sales of weapons to Croatia in the middle of the Balkans war. His wife Lucía Hiriart and his son Marco Antonio Pinochet were also sued for complicity. For the fourth time in seven years, Pinochet was indicted by the Chilean justice.

The Chilean authorities took control in August 2005 of the Colonia Dignidad concentration camp, directed by ex-Nazi Paul Schäfer.

2005 reform of the 1980 Constitution
Over 50 reforms to Pinochet's Constitution were approved in 2005, which eliminated some of the remaining undemocratic areas of the text, such as the existence of non-elected Senators (institutional senators, or senators for life) and the inability of the President to remove the Commander in Chief of the Armed Forces. These reforms led the President to controversially declare Chile's transition to democracy as complete. However, its anti-terrorist measures remained, which have been used against the indigenous Mapuche. Furthermore, the military still receives money from the copper industry.

Bachelet administration

In 2006, the Concertación again won the presidential election: Michelle Bachelet, Chile's first woman president, beat Sebastián Piñera (Alliance for Chile), and obtained more than 53% of the vote. Bachelet's first political crisis occurred with massive protests by students who were demanding free bus fare and waiving of the university admissions test (PSU) fee, among longer-term demands such as the abolition of the Organic Constitutional Law on Teaching (LOCE), an end to municipalization of subsidized education, a reform to the Full-time School Day policy (JEC) and a quality education for all. The protests peaked on 30 May 2006, when 790,000 students adhered to strikes and marches throughout the country, becoming Chile's largest student demonstration of the past three decades.

The 2006–2007 Chilean corruption scandals were a series of events in which the Chilean governing Concertación was under investigations of corruption.

In June 2007, General Raúl Iturriaga, the former deputy director of the DINA, was sentenced to five years' imprisonment for the abduction of Luis Dagoberto San Martin in 1974. Iturriaga had been in hiding from the authorities for a number of years but was arrested in August 2007.

The CUT trade-union federation called for demonstrations in August 2007. These went on during the night, and at least 670 people were arrested, including journalists and a mayor, and 33 carabineros were injured. The protests were aimed against the Bachelet government's free market policies. Socialist Senator Alejandro Navarro was injured by the police during the demonstrations, although it later emerged that he had hit and kicked police and is currently under investigation by the Senate Ethics Committee. Senators from the opposition have requested that Navarro and other congressmen who participated in the protest be removed from Congress for violating the constitutional article which bans congressmen from participating in demonstrations which "violate the peace".

In August 2007, a BBC correspondent wrote that about three million workers, roughly half the workforce, earned the minimum wage of $260 (£130) a month. At the same time, Arturo Martínez, general secretary of the CUT, requested explanations from the government and accused it of having stirred up the tension. Politicians from the center-right Alianza and from the governing center-left Concertación have in turn criticized the CUT for the violence of the protest.

Piñera administration

Second Bachelet administration

Second Piñera administration

Massive civilian protests started on 18 October 2019, when Chilean people demanded a new constitution, the ability to end the transition period, and start a real democracy. The protests have hopes of reducing and eliminating social and economic inequality, improving health, education and other public systems, and ending the current pension system (AFP), amongst other important issues. The appointed 26 April 2020 referendum has been delayed to 25 October due to the COVID-19 Pandemic, and the ensuing elections for a Constituent Assembly to write the new constitution have been themselves delayed from 25 October 2020 to 11 April 2021. The elections were moved back to 15-16 May 2021 and completed successfully.

Boric administration

See also
2006 student protests in Chile
Transition to democracy
No, a film about the 1988 referendum

References

External links
Democratic Transition in Chile from the Dean Peter Krogh Foreign Affairs Digital Archives

1990s in Chile
Political history of Chile
Democratization
Political movements in Chile
Augusto Pinochet
Military dictatorship of Chile (1973–1990)
Revolutions of 1989